Lennard Hartjes (born 7 April 2003) is a Dutch professional footballer who plays as a midfielder for the Eerste Divisie club Roda JC Kerkrade, on loan from Feyenoord.

Club career

Feyenoord
Hartjes is a youth product of Spijkenisse and Sparta Rotterdam, and joined the youth academy of Feyenoord in 2015. He signed his first professional contract with the club on 18 July 2020.

Ahead of the 2021–22 season, Hartjes and fellow academy player Antoni Milambo were promoted to first team by head coach Arne Slot. He made his professional debut for Feyenoord in a 3–0 UEFA Europa Conference League win over FC Luzern on 12 August 2021, replacing Orkun Kökçü in the 58th minute.

Roda JC (loan)
On 15 August 2022, Hartjes joined Eerste Divisie club Roda JC Kerkrade on a season-long loan. He made his debut for the club as a starter in defensive midfield in a 3–0 away win in the league over FC Den Bosch after a hat-trick from former Feyenoord teammate Dylan Vente. On 18 October, Hartjes scored his first competitive goal at senior level, providing the 2–2 equaliser in a KNVB Cup match against Heracles Almelo. Despite keeping Roda's hopes of advancement alive, Hartjes would later miss the decisive penalty in the shootout, knocking the club out of the cup competition. He scored his first league goal on 30 January 2023 in a 2–1 away defeat to league leaders PEC Zwolle.

International career
Hartjes was called up by Netherlands under-19 team coach Bert Konterman in August 2021. He made his international debut for the under-19s on 6 September 2021, replacing Dylan Hopman during half-time of a friendly against Italy at Sportpark Nieuw Zuid in Katwijk.

Career statistics

References

External links
 

2003 births
Living people
People from Spijkenisse
Dutch footballers
Netherlands youth international footballers
Feyenoord players
Roda JC Kerkrade players
Eerste Divisie players
Association football midfielders
Footballers from South Holland